Pill is a surname. Notable people with the surname include: 

 Alison Pill (born 1985), Canadian actress
 Brett Pill (born 1984), American baseball player
 Cathy Pill (born 1981), Belgian fashion designer
 Huw Pill, British economist, chief economist of the Bank of England
 Malcolm Pill (born 1938), British judge
 Tyler Pill (born 1990), American baseball player
 Willow Pill (born 1995), American drag queen